The 2022 Malaysia M3 League was the 2nd season of Malaysia M3 League, the third-tier semi-professional football league in Malaysia, since its establishment in 2019. This is the first time the league had a full completed season since the 2019 season, after the 2020 season has been abandoned after only 2 games played due to COVID-19 restrictions nationwide, and the 2021 season being cancelled before the start of the season due to the same restrictions.

The season started on 12 February and concluded on 24 September 2022.

Establishment and format
This new season saw the format restructuring by the Amateur Football League (AFL). On 19 January 2020, the AFL has announced the format changes for the Malaysia M3 League and Malaysia M4 League in preparation for the transition of the amateur team to semi-professionals by 2021.

The league will kick-off with 20 teams and to be split into 2 groups, an increase of 6 teams compared to 14 teams in the previous edition. The top four teams of each group will then play in the play-offs to determine which teams will qualify for promotion to the Premier League in the 2023 season. The bottom three teams of each group will be relegated to the M4 League.

On July 20, the Malaysian Football League (MFL) has announced that the finalists of the M3 League will be playing against the bottom 2 non-feeder teams from the Premier League to determine the last 2 teams qualify for the 2023 Malaysia Super League, which will now consists of 18 teams. If M3 clubs win the playoffs, they must still fulfil MFL’s club licensing criteria before being allowed to compete in Malaysia Super League. However, on 27 September 2022, it was announced by Malaysia Football League that the 7 M3 teams that applied for licensing to play in Super League, including champions PIB FC, have failed in their application, and consequently are not involved in the promotion to Super League.

Season changes

Malaysia M3 League

 Kinabalu Jaguar
 Armed Forces
 BRM
 FC Langkawi
 Harini
 Immigration
 Kijang Rangers
 Kuala Lumpur Rovers
 Langkawi City
 Malaysia University
 Manjung City
 Perlis United 
 PIB
 Real Chukai
 SAINS 
 Ultimate

New Team
 Bukit Tambun
 Respect
 Tok Janggut Warriors
 Tun Razak City

Team withdrawal
 Cyberlynx
 MNY
 Kuala Kangsar
 Protap

Clubs locations

Venues

Personnel and sponsoring

League table

Group A

Group B

Result table

Group A

Group B

Knock-out stage

Bracket

Quarter-finals

First leg

Second leg 

Kuala Lumpur Rovers won 4-3 on aggregate.

 PIB FC won 1-0 on aggregate.

 BRM FC won on away goal regulation, aggregate 3-3.

Immigration FC won 3-2 on aggregate.

Semi-finals

First leg

Second leg 

 Kuala Lumpur Rovers FC won on away goal regulation, aggregate 2-2.

PIB FC won 3-1 on aggregate.

Finals

PIB FC win 5–3 on penalties

Season statistics

Top scorers

Hat-tricks

Notes
4 Player scored 4 goals
5 Player scored 5 goals
(H) – Home team(A) – Away team

See also 
 2022 Malaysia Super League
 2022 Malaysia Premier League
 2022 Malaysia M5 League
 2022 Malaysia FA Cup
 2022 Malaysia Cup
 2022 Malaysia Challenge Cup
 2020 Piala Presiden
 2022 Piala Belia
 List of Malaysian football transfers 2022

References

External links
 Football Association of Malaysia website - M3 League

2022 in Malaysian football
Malaysia M3 League seasons